Raúl Nieto (born 7 April 1961) is a Mexican equestrian. He competed in the team jumping event at the 1984 Summer Olympics.

References

1961 births
Living people
Mexican male equestrians
Olympic equestrians of Mexico
Equestrians at the 1984 Summer Olympics
Pan American Games medalists in equestrian
Pan American Games bronze medalists for Mexico
Equestrians at the 1983 Pan American Games
Place of birth missing (living people)
Medalists at the 1983 Pan American Games